Nabil Kanso (1940-2019) was an American painter. Kanso began his career in New York. 
His works dealt with contemporary, historical and literary themes, and were marked by figurative imagery executed with spontaneous and vigorous handling of the paint and often done on large-scale formats. They reflected movement and tension embodying intense colors and symbolic forms addressing social, political, and war issues. The Vietnam War and the Lebanese Civil War profoundly affected the development and scope of his themes dealing with violence and war. His long-running Split of Life series encompassed an extensive range of enormous paintings depicting scenes of human brutality and suffering.

Life and work
Nabil Kanso grew up in a house adorned with Italian and Oriental art. In 1961, he went to England, and attended the London Polytechnic studying mathematics and science.

In 1966, Kanso moved to New York, and enrolled at New York University where he received BA and MA in art history, philosophy and political science. 1968, he committed himself to painting, acquired a studio in Manhattan, and embarked on developing his ideas and method of painting.
Kanso was part of the post-modernist movement, which enveloped music, fine art, film, and writing. Characteristics of this style is stressing "communication" from artist to audience, and throwing out the traditional narrative the "life has meaning". That Creed of Modernism fell apart after skepticism in mankind's inherent goodness came about after the Holocaust.

1970–1979
In 1971, Kanso held his first one-man show at the 76th Street Gallery exhibiting 80 paintings that included portraits and nudes in compositions reflecting in varying degrees expressionist, romanticist and symbolist influences. Between 1971 and 1973 he held a series of solo shows that included the Wanderer, Danse Macabre, Birds of Prey, Place des Martyres, and Expressions. Although the exhibitions drew attention and reviews, the lack of sufficient subsistence forced the closing of his studio whose contents including over 700 works  were placed in storage, and, eventually, lost or destroyed.
Between 1974 and 1979, Kanso took studios in different locations in the Carolinas, Atlanta, and New Orleans producing a large number of paintings. Among the works of this period are the series Vietnam (1974), Lebanon, which he began in 1975, at the outbreak of the Lebanese Civil War, One-Minute (1978–79) on Hiroshima and Nagasaki, the Jazz suite (1978–79) on jazz music, and Faust (1976–79) comprising over 100 paintings on Goethe's drama.

1980–2007
In 1980, Kanso established a studio in Atlanta and held several exhibitions. In 1984, he went to Venezuela where his works were shown in Maracaibo (1985), Caracas (1987), and Mérida (1987–88). The exhibitions were an invaluable stimulant in initiating the Journey of Art for Peace through which his works were shown under the auspices of art museums, cultural institutions, and peace centers in extensive solo exhibitions that traveled internationally and particularly in Latin America. Kanso displays his works by covering the entire walls of the exhibition space with his paintings. The installation surrounding the viewer aims to convey the intensity between the reality of the subject matter and the actuality of painting, and reflect the artist's engagement with the canvases whose contents represent his visual life and relationship to conflicting Eastern and Western cultures and traditions.

Among the works of this period are the series South Africa (1980), Apocalyptic Riders (1980), DreamVision (1980–81), Lebanon (1982–83), Apocalypse (1984), Warring Wings (1984–85), Othello (1985), the Cluster Paintings (1986–1988), Leaves from the Theatre of War (1980s), The Dance of Salome (1988), America 500 Years (1989–1991), Kuwait 1990–91, Living Memory (1993–94), Bosnia (1995–96), Portraits (1997–1999), Iraq (2004–2006).

Lebanese Civil War and Kanso
In 1958, Nabil Kanso had to stop going to school in Lebanon due to the civil war. In his biography, he talks about how he spent much of his time at the houses of friends and families doing sketches and painting to pass the day. The Lebanese Civil War gave a lot for young Kanso to paint about. His painting The Vortices of Wrath (Lebanon 1977) is a perfect depiction of the country in a time of war. The dark grays and black make for a gloomy, sad mood. In the center, it appears as though there is a power struggle between rugged figures. There is one power trying to over come the other. The way kanso uses blurry images gives a creepy feel. While in the background it appears as though there are skeleton like figures. His brush strokes are very apparent and give the painting its life even though it is all about death. It is clear that Kanso drew from the time of the war by the way he make the paintings so solemn.

The Lebanese Civil war was not the only influence in Kanso's work but also the wars in Vietnam and  the continuing war in the Middle East. We can clearly see this in his paintings Desert Storm. Here he shows women suffering by losing a child becoming victims of war. "The victims," an art critic writes, "are the newborn torn out of wombs or clinging to mothers fleeing natural catastrophes or political disasters." It is noted by some critics that motherhood is important with Kanso's women; you see mothers at the moment of birth and in death holding children in their arms. The bars that recur from one work to another are sometimes placed at the opening of the woman's womb. The children suffer with their mothers as fire, storms, or ice intensifies the human situation. People of different religions are united in suffering and passion in these works of art.  The noted lack of greens in Kanso's art marks his criticism of destruction of the environment. Nothing can grow during war. Flesh and blood appears to be everywhere. Water is for drowning, or for freezing. Icicles look like hairy insect legs or barbed wire. The rarely discerned sky sometimes reveals a glimpse of the forefathers like pale blue ghosts look down at their descendants.  War has a major influence in his work and has made his work become almost biblical and it's represented in his paintings dealing with war and apocalyptic themes, and the Apocalypse He uses apocalyptic science in his art work making them almost biblical by painting his work with earthquakes, floods, ice, fire and blood referring this to the bible's apocalypse. Nabil Kanso's apocalyptic themes can be said to be linking with the destruction of the Middle East due to war, to the destruction of the birthplace of Jesus and Christianity.

War and apocalyptic themes

War and apocalyptic themes are central focus of Kanso's works since the early seventies. They provide the primary basis for his large-scale paintings responding to war and depicting apocalyptic visions "Over the course of his career," an art critic writes, "Kanso created an extraordinary body of work dealing with war and apocalyptic themes that open up the visions of apocalyptic art." In dealing with horrors of war," another critic writes, "Kanso creates enormous paintings that serve as powerful weapons in fighting war." "Kanso declares war on war," reads a headline article on his Gulf War exhibition in Kuwait. The paintings show the whole gamut of human suffering and pain. The tortured language itself makes his work a universal manifestation of solidarity and protest against the proliferation of war. The canvases reveal a world permeated by a chain of chaos and violence in a hellish environment from which people are desperately trying to escape in order to survive. They find themselves immersed in an incisive and violent totality in which they are trapped.

The emotionally steering images draw the interest and involvement of the public in witnessing the violent events in scenes filled with pathos and tensions that reach extreme intensity. The depicted horror, one critic notes, present a form of interiority as for example in the interior of Afghanistan, Lebanon, Nicaragua, El Salvador, Vietnam. A total war, a pure war, one in which destruction is rallied to the absolute in conjunction with the corporeal and everything "else" is relegated to the status of target or cipher, a demarcation of the site of a bullet, bomb, or rocket. Hell is nothing but what it is. His paintings transmit images of the palpable reality of a world where pain, suffering, brutality, and destruction are everywhere. "They provide," a critics notes "a powerful indictment and denunciation of wars in the Middle East and Central America. Hence the mural-scale format enveloping an enormous space in projecting harrowing images as a consequence of  war."

The reality of what is happening in a war zone and what is expressed in the painting underlines the relationship of the artist's mental and physical involvement with the work. He expresses a juncture between his supercharged psyche and our anxiety and fear, provoking the explosion we see and feel in his paintings. "The intensity of the portrayed scenes heightens the atmosphere of fear and oppression", one critic remarks, "and awakens us or at least gives our dream an authentic vision of the final disaster." They open a window through which we contemplate and ponder on our precarious existence, beginning with the most intransigent and total fact of contemporary fear: total extinction. "They reveal, the never-ending darkness existing in an ephemeral glare right before bursting. The power of weapons is a terrible and absurd reality which mutates the space of human warmth." "The very idea of the possible destruction of the planet by nuclear war has totally changed our view of the world," observed Octavio Paz. "Meanwhile," a critic notes, "the world debates on perpetual small wars undermining the planet with ongoing disasters. The destruction and devastation of war are shown to us in the images of Nabil Kanso who Venezuelans came to know him as the Painter of the Apocalypse." He faithfully expresses orphanage, rage and the importance of living. "His mural paintings," a critic observed, "stand as a tribunal in interpreting and transmitting the voices that burst out of the canvases in a massive force, and plunge into an apocalyptic storm."

Kanso's style
Nabil Kanso's works have been said to be apocalyptic in many ways, in Kanso's works he paints scenes of destruction, destroyed buildings, and people usually naked with looks of horror on their faces. He uses red, orange, and yellow to resemble fire, dark colors as if he was painting a nightmare or a scene of hell.

In carrying out his work Nabil Kanso appears calm and quiet. But the light of fire in the paintings look like nightmares which he has to work through, often spending several months on one painting. Kanso's outstanding mural-scale paintings are a cross between the specificity of Goya's 'Horror of War' and the universality of Picasso's Guernica. To stand in the central space surrounded by Nabil Kanso's 12-foot-high paintings is as close as you get to being in the middle of a fire. Using lurid oranges, yellows and reds, Kanso fills every inch of canvas with visions of violence and human suffering that rival medieval descriptions of Hell. One painting went the entire length of the room, maybe 30 feet. I felt like a coward. It was almost impossible to look at the power and extravagance of these scenes, so I turned instead and looked at the faces of the other onlookers. In their faces were the reflections of the painted holocaust around us. I turned again to the painting which now entrapped is in a cage of feeling. It is noted by some critics that "Kanso's highly expressive personal style evokes experiences and visions that reveal the inner essence of a reality lying beyond its external aspects".  A critic viewed the works linkage at an exhibition in Atlanta as "a net, a polyvalence of economic, cultural, political, and sexual discourse." The net is not just a formal manipulation to tie the divergent contents of the paintings together, but "a very real device that grew out of the complex discourse of the paintings and ultimately from the poetics of the painter."  At a 10-year survey in Caracas a critic wrote "the installation of Kanso monumental paintings projects an immense space charged with a high level of intensity closely connected to the tension and anxiety that we face in the world today. His apocalyptic paintings offers us a voyage to the hells of our time."

Studios

Early in 1967, Kanso set up a studio on East 20th Street at Gramercy Park South, and in 1968, moved to a larger studio on East 76th Street where it remained until 1974 when it was seized and its contents were placed in storage, and, eventually, lost.  For a period he worked in New York and in different cities in the South, and in 1980, he settled Atlanta where he acquired a spacious studio.

For more than 20 years, the studio was an attractive place for many visitors. A critic described it as "filled with enormous paintings representing a kind of a nightmare about the war in Lebanon, which has been the subject of Kanso's large paintings since the war started in 1975." It is not just the horrors of the war in Lebanon that he is painting, it is as much the disasters of war in Vietnam, Nicaragua, and El Salvador. Rows of canvases are swarming with figures fleeing, fighting with each other, eating each other." Another critic observed "canvasses rolled up in great numbers like mummies," and noted the connection between the linen cloth in Egyptian wraps and Kanso's own life. His father founded a linen cloth business in Mexico. 
In describing a visit to his studio, an art critic wrote "walking around was like taking a tour of Dante's Inferno. With agitated brushstrokes and lurid oranges, Kanso has produced a roomful of frightening images reminiscent of late Goya's mural, all the more menacing because they are over 7 feet tall".
A reviewer remarked "Startled is a weak word to describe my reaction. Every wall covered with paintings that reached the ceilings. In some places, the paintings were leaning against each other several deep. Others, lots, rolled up on the floor. It was hard to believe one man had done all of this. It wasn't just that the paintings were large but their content was brilliantly focused, it came from a seeming struggle going on in a landscape that appeared biblical."

Books
 The Split of Life: Paintings 1974-1994, NEV Editions, 1996, 
 Faust: Paintings 1976-1979, NEV Editions, 1997,  
 Othello 1985, NEV Editions, 1997,

References

External links
Official site
The Split of Life
Lebanon Paintings
Works for Peace
America series

 
1946 births
2019 deaths
20th-century American painters
American male painters
21st-century American painters
Lebanese emigrants to the United States
American contemporary painters
Painters from New York City
Lebanese Druze
Artists from Beirut
Lebanese painters
Artists from Atlanta
Postmodern artists
Painting controversies
Censorship in the arts
New York University alumni
American Druze
Neo-expressionist artists